The Royal University of Fine Arts (RUFA;) is a university in Chey Chumneas, Phnom Penh specialising in architecture and fine arts. It is the oldest university in Cambodia, having been in existence since 1917.

The establishment of the Royal University of Fine Arts dates back to 1917. At the time, the Khmer Arts School was established inside the Royal Palace. Later, because the courtyard inside the Royal Palace was too small, King Sisowath tasked the French artist George Grolier, as well as seven other Cambodian artists, with establishing a new Fine Arts School situated at the present-day site of the Royal University of Fine Arts. In 1965, the Fine Arts School was transformed into the Royal University of Fine Arts, which had five faculties: Faculty of Choreographic Arts, which was expanded from the national dance group; Faculty of Music, expanded from the musical school; and the Faculty of Plastic Arts, expanded from the Khmer Arts School or Fine Arts School. At the same time, two new faculties were established: Faculty of Archaeology, and the Faculty of Architecture and Urbanization.

The university operated until April 1975, when it closed as the country fell to the Khmer Rouge regime.

In October 1988, the Cambodian government issued the sub-decree to re-open the university as the University of Fine Arts. Then, the university was renamed the Royal University of Fine Arts in the sub-decree in October 1996.

Dance
The Cambodian fishing dance performance was composed in the 1960s at the Royal University of Fine Arts in Phnom Penh.  It involves male dancers and female dancers.  The dance is set in a rural setting where the dancers have rattan baskets and scoops.

Faculties 
Department of Foundation Year
Faculty of Archaeology
Faculty of Architecture and Urbanism
Faculty of Choreographic Arts 
Faculty of Music 
Faculty of Plastic Arts

Alumni 
 Nuon Kan

References

External links 
 Official site
 
 Cultural profiles
 
 Cultural profile

Royal University of Fine Arts
Education in Phnom Penh
Educational institutions established in 1917
1917 establishments in French Indochina